Linda Leavell is an American writer, scholar, and professor. Her biography of Marianne Moore won the PEN Weld Award for Biography and the Plutarch Award. It was a finalist for the National Book Critics Circle Award.

Life 
Leavell graduated from Baylor University and received her PhD in English from Rice University.
She was a professor of American literature at Rhodes College for one year and at Oklahoma State University for 24 years.

Works 
 Marianne Moore and the Visual Arts: Prismatic Color , Louisiana State University Press, 1995. 
 Holding On Upside Down: The Life and Work of Marianne Moore Farrar, Straus and Giroux, 2013.

References

External links 

Date of birth missing (living people)
Living people
American writers
Baylor University alumni
Rice University alumni
Year of birth missing (living people)